The National Federation of Commerce was a trade union representing workers in retail and related industries in Spain.

The union held its first congress in 1978, and affiliated to the Workers' Commissions.  By 1981, it had 8,655 members, and by 1994, its membership had grown to 19,769.  In 1996, it merged with the National Federation of Hotel and Tourism Workers, to form the National Federation of Trade, Hotels and Tourism.

References

Retail trade unions
Trade unions established in 1978
Trade unions disestablished in 1996
Trade unions in Spain